The Tokyo Koku Ki-107 was a Japanese military training aircraft for the Imperial Japanese Army Air Force. The Ki-107 was a wooden-built low-wing two-seat monoplane with an open cockpit. Powered by a Hitachi Hatsukaze Ha-47 (Ha-11) inline piston engine it first flew in October 1943. The Japanese Army had ordered 450 as primary trainers as replacement for the Kokusai Ki-86 (a license built Bücker Bü 131 that used the same Ha-47 engine), but production was held up by air raids and only 29 had been delivered by the end of the war.

Operators

 Imperial Japanese Army Air Force

Specifications

References
Notes

Bibliography

  (new edition 1987 by Putnam Aeronautical Books, .)
 

1940s Japanese military trainer aircraft